The Metropolitan Green Belt is a statutory green belt around London, England. It comprises parts of Greater London, Berkshire, Buckinghamshire, Essex, Hertfordshire, Kent and Surrey, parts of two of the three districts of Bedfordshire and a small area in Copthorne, Sussex.  Government statistics show the planning designation covered  of land.

History
For some years after 1580 Elizabeth I of England banned new building in a three-mile wide belt around the City of London, in an attempt to stop the spread of plague. However, this was not widely enforced, relatively short-lived and it was possible to buy dispensations which reduced the effect.

The concept was also inspired by those elsewhere in Europe, one being inner buffer zones and broad boulevards to separate non-ancient parts.

The first major proposals for a green belt were put forward from 1890 onward, but the first to garner widespread support was put forward by the London Society (LS) in its Development Plan of Greater London 1919. The LS, alongside the Campaign to Protect Rural England (CPRE), first lobbied for a belt (initially of up to two miles wide) to prevent urban sprawl, beyond which new development could occur; this was not realised. The great interwar Britain housing boom, from 8 million homes in 1921 to 11.3 million in 1939, saw most of today's Greater London apart from its very edge developed too densely to be conferred any near-contiguous green belt status. The great increase in private motor transport continued into the 1950s. Despite new roads and the London Underground, London traffic congestion and pollution was forecast to become highly problematic unless development could be encouraged outside of a contiguous capital city. In 1947, Jean-François Gravier successfully advocated to the French government major policies to reduce "regional disparity". Labour's Attlee ministry acted similarly in Britain, first enacting the New Towns Act 1946 and issuing Circulars and Planning Policies for local government councils to implement including accelerating the designation of the Metropolitan Green Belt.

The first policy groundwork to the Metropolitan Green Belt was in Herbert Morrison's 1934 leadership of the London County Council. It was first formally proposed by the Greater London Regional Planning Committee in 1935, "to provide a reserve supply of public open spaces and of recreational areas and to establish a green belt or girdle of open space". After passage of the Green Belt Act 1938, it took 14 years for the elected local authorities responsible for the area around London to define the area on scaled maps with some precision. Following the establishment of the belt around London, feedback being received, and statements and debates in the House of Commons, other authorities nationwide were similarly encouraged in 1955 by Minister Duncan Sandys to designate a belt of all undeveloped land. As to London it was idealised to extend to land not earmarked for building "7 to 10 miles deep all around the built-up area of Greater London".

New provisions for compensation in the Town and Country Planning Act 1947 allowed local authorities to incorporate green belt proposals in their first development plans. The codification of Green Belt policy and its extension to areas other than London came with Sandys' annexed Circular  urging the Clerk of the Council of all local planning authorities (impliedly who had not done so already) to establish Green Belts "wherever it is desirable....(a) to check further growth of a large built-up area; (b) to prevent neighbouring towns from merging into one another; or (c) preserve the special character of a town." This decision was made in tandem with the New Towns Act 1946, which accompanied other acts turning to commercial use or low density bomb-stricken parts of Inner London, providing new homes for residents in districts of Outer London which would accept social housing and founding the post-war new towns. Created under the New Towns Act outside of the belt were Basildon, Bracknell, Harlow, Hatfield, Hemel Hempstead, Milton Keynes and Stevenage. Much funding was outlaid in new roads, railway stations and social housing. Contrasting to these new towns such a degree of social housing was still as strongly resisted as possible in upmarket suburbs and most of the existing exurbs well-connected to London in the new Green Belt which almost unwaveringly elected majority-Conservative councils. Such private housing-dominant bastions of the Green Belt being Edgware, Amersham, Staines upon Thames, Surbiton, Sevenoaks and Epping.

In the 1938–1950s period, earmarking of the Green Belt intra-London infill areas continued to be earmarked for housing and those to "round off" the shape of London as official policy. A direct consequence was that when London was redrawn (namely from the 1889 County of London to Greater London) its area in 1965 was made five times greater. This selective and encouraged urbanisation, coupled with the New Towns, ensured authorities did not need to expect a shortage of housing and were centrally lobbied (and in some cases also locally lobbied) to designate land as Green Belt in order to offset congestion and pollution consequent upon their policies of growth.

As the outward growth of London was seen to be firmly repressed, residents owning properties further from the built-up area also campaigned for this policy of urban restraint, partly to safeguard their own investments but often invoking the paradigm English thinking running from John Ruskin to at least John Betjeman, a scenic/rustic argument which lays the blame for most social ills upon urban influences and which leads few retired people to live in London. In mid-1971, mindful of the new towns in Bedfordshire and Hertfordshire, the government decided to extend the Metropolitan Green Belt northwards to include almost all of Hertfordshire. The Metropolitan Green Belt now covers parts of 68 different Districts or Boroughs.

Extension and reduction

London's green belt was extended after 1955, in places to a distance of 35 miles out. The belt is subject to minor annual variations, and covers an area approximately three times the size of London.

Extension has taken place to take in large parts of the Surrey Hills, Chiltern Hills and three of the areas known as various Wealds including Epping Forest, as such extension pre-dates certain largely duplicative protections which cover those areas, particularly Areas of Outstanding Natural Beauty. Redesignation includes for transport or civil engineering infrastructure, housing and non-agricultural industry, retail and non-green or blue buffer leisure. In general agriculture and open-air leisure uses, including golf courses, and fresh water reservoirs (often used for sailing), can be designated green belt land.

All Local Authorities have the option of limited green belt land release in their Local Plans, according to legally necessary "exceptional circumstances" envisioned by the 1955 Act.

Debate and controversy 
The London Society heightened debate about the city's green belt in 2014 in its report entitled "Green Sprawl". Other organisations, including the Planning Officers Society, echoed with specific calls for a UK Governmental review and proposals to balance land release for with concepts to compensate habitat loss and mitigate pollution, restitutionally (as if never converted).

The Adam Smith Institute wrote a paper under its core ethos of economic liberalism challenging the goals of nature and environmental protection groups who advocate greater urban density. The paper highlighted the Metropolitan Green Belt had land to build a million typical closer London fringe (low-to-medium) density homes within ten minutes walk (800m) of existing train stations, specifically circa . It critiqued  of golf course land.

A survey in 2016, by Ipsos Mori, found that many Londoners, particularly those who live in the most affected areas, think the trend towards ever taller, bolder skyscrapers has gone too far. More than 400 buildings of more than 20 floors in 2016 were tentatively proposed by developers in London. Among respondents, six out of ten backed a limit on the height of new skyscrapers, with the same proportion backing restrictions on the number of buildings with more than 50 floors.

Designated area

The table lists the areas designated as the Metropolitan Green Belt in 2014. By 2014 the only Inner London Borough to have had Green Belt, Greenwich, had lost its few acres of green belt designation.

Every borough or equivalent district of the reduced counties of Surrey and Hertfordshire has Green Belt as does Bedfordshire, a county which has never contributed to present definition of London and has just 3 local government units. Four of five districts in Buckinghamshire, 4 of 6 in Berkshire, 9 of 14 in Essex, 7 of 13 in Kent, 18 of the 32 London boroughs, and 1 of the 13 Sussex districts/boroughs/unitary authorities has Green Belt.

Notes and references

Notes

References

Outskirts, by John Grindrod

External links
London Green Belt Council - Interactive Map 

Geography of London
Environment of London
Protected areas established in 1938
Protected areas of London
Green belts in the United Kingdom
Town and country planning in London
Home counties